Kadboli or kadaboli (Konkani and ), is a traditional savoury snack prepared in Konkan, India. Kadboli is typically made from a mixture of chickpea, urad, moong and rice flour, salt, and flavourings such as chili, ajwain, or cumin.

The same dish is known as kodubale in Karnataka, the only difference being that only rice and split roasted chickpea (dalia) flour is used.

Other details
Kadboli lasts for few weeks if stored properly in air tight container. As a result, this snack is a great anytime snack.
Kadboli is mainly prepared in the states of Maharashtra, Andhra Pradesh and Karnataka.

References

Indian snack foods
Maharashtrian cuisine
Konkani cuisine